Williams Canyon is a unincorporated community (CDP) in the canyon of the same name in Orange County, California, United States. It is located in eastern Orange County on the western side of the Santa Ana Mountains, south of Silverado and north of Modjeska. Most of the community is within Cleveland National Forest. For statistical purposes, the United States Census Bureau first listed Williams Canyon as a census-designated place (CDP) prior to the 2020 census.

References 

Census-designated places in Orange County, California
Census-designated places in California